The 42nd Brother Rally New Zealand was the seventh round of 2012 FIA World Rally Championship. The event took place between 22 and 24 June 2012.

Results

Event standings

Special stages

Power stage
The three fastest crews of this stage were awarded by championship points.

References

New Zealand
Rally New Zealand
Rally